U.S. National Bank Building, short for United States National Bank Building, may refer to:

in the United States (by state, then city):
 The Executive Complex, San Diego, California – formerly known as the U.S. National Bank Building
 The Bank Lofts, formerly known as the U.S. National Bank Building, Denver, Colorado, listed on the U.S. National Register of Historic Places (NRHP) under that earlier name
 United States National Bank Building, Portland, Oregon, NRHP-listed
 U.S. National Bank Building (Galveston, Texas), NRHP-listed in Galveston County
 U.S. National Bank Building (Vancouver, Washington), NRHP-listed in Clark County